"All the Time" is a song by Swedish singer Zara Larsson, released through TEN Music Group and Epic Records on 21 June 2019. Described as a pop and synth-pop track, it was co-written by Larsson with Noonie Bao, Ilsey Juber, Linus Wiklund and produced by the latter. Initially released as a standalone single, the song appears on the Japanese edition of Larsson's third studio album, Poster Girl.

Critical reception
Dominic Beck from CelebMix said of the song that "[it] appears to be that perfect summer pop banger we seem to have been missing this year" while Mike Wass of Idolator described the song as a "throwback to the carefree pure-pop of 'Lush Life' — albeit with a side of heartbreak".

Promotion
Larsson performed the song during her setlist at Radio 1's Big Weekend 2019 on Sunday 26 May.

Larsson announced the song's release on social media on 14 June, the same day as her collaboration with South Korean boy band BTS, "A Brand New Day", was released.

Music video
A music video for "All the Time" was released to promote the single. It features three showgirl characters portrayed by Larsson dancing against a neon backdrop and pink metallic streamers.

Remixes

Don Diablo released a future house remix of the track on 5 July 2019. The track was released both on Don Diablo and Zara Larsson's YouTube channel.

Charts

Certifications

Release history

References

2019 singles
2019 songs
Zara Larsson songs
Songs written by Ilsey Juber
Songs written by Noonie Bao
Songs written by Linus Wiklund
Songs written by Zara Larsson